Ihalagama Niyangama is a village in Sri Lanka. It is located within North Western Province.

See also
List of settlements in North Western Province (Sri Lanka)

External links

Populated places in Kurunegala District